The 2021–22 Svenska Cupen Damer is the 39th edition of the women's association football main cup competition in Sweden.

Format
52 teams from the Division 1 and below entered the first round. The winners will then join the Elitettan teams at the second round, while the Damallsvenskan teams join at the third round 

The qualification round starts from June and ends in February, after which the last 16 clubs would be grouped into 4 groups of 4 teams each.

Calendar
Below are the dates for each round as given by the official schedule:

Qualification round

First round 
52 teams from the Division 1 and lower entered this round via their districts qualifications. Matches were played between 21 June and 18 August 2021.

Matches

Second round 
The 26 winners from the first round plus the 14 Elitettan teams play in this round. Matches are played between 25 August and 8 September 2021.

Matches

Third round 
The 20 winners from the first round plus the 12 Damallsvenskan teams play in this round.

Matches

Group stage 
The last 16 teams were divided into 4 groups of 4 teams each.

Group A

Matches

Group B

Matches

Group C

Matches

Group D

Matches

Knockout stage

Semi-finals

Final

Statistics

Top scorers

References 

2021 in Swedish women's football
2021–22 domestic association football cups